William Mokoena (born 31 March 1975 in Johannesburg) is a South African football player. He was widely known by his nickname Naughty due to constantly misbehaviour, scandals and controversies.

He has played for Manning Rangers, Orlando Pirates and AmaZulu. After being relegated with African Wanderers during 2000–01 season, he was signed by Moroka Swallows.

International career
Mokoena played four matches for South Africa U23 team in 1995. Mokoena was included in the South Africa national football team for the 1998 FIFA World Cup in France but did not play. He chose to return home, along with Brendan Augustine after being fined R100,000 for breaches of discipline after breaking curfew set by coach Philippe Troussier.

References

1975 births
Living people
Sportspeople from Johannesburg
South African Sotho people
South African soccer players
1998 FIFA World Cup players
Manning Rangers F.C. players
Orlando Pirates F.C. players
AmaZulu F.C. players
Moroka Swallows F.C. players
Black Leopards F.C. players
Association football midfielders
Lusitano F.C. (South Africa) players